Huntington Township is the name of several townships in the United States:

 Huntington Township, Huntington County, Indiana
 Huntington, New York
 Huntington Township, Brown County, Ohio
 Huntington Township, Gallia County, Ohio
 Huntington Township, Lorain County, Ohio
 Huntington Township, Ross County, Ohio
 Huntington Township, Adams County, Pennsylvania
 Huntington Township, Luzerne County, Pennsylvania

Township name disambiguation pages